Isac Ludo (1894–1973) was a Romanian writer and political figure.

Born into a Jewish-Romanian family, Ludo was active in left-wing literary circles prior to World War II. After the Communist take-over in 1947, he rose to important positions in the régime's censorship office.

Prior to 1965, he published a series of novels — Domnul general guvernează ("The General Rules"), Starea de asediu ("State of Siege"), Regele Palaelibus ("King Palaelibus"), Salvatorul ("The Saver"), Ultimul batalion ("The Last Battalion") — which constituted a satirical panorama of political life in Greater Romania.

Ludo also published translations into Romanian from the Yiddish language writer Scholem Aleichem.

Romanian censors
Writers from Iași
Jewish Romanian writers
Jewish socialists
Romanian male novelists
Romanian socialists
Romanian translators
1894 births
1973 deaths
20th-century Romanian novelists
20th-century translators
20th-century Romanian male writers